Uitgeest is a municipality and a town in the Netherlands, in the province of North Holland.

Population centres 
The municipality of Uitgeest consists of the following cities, towns, villages and/or districts:

Topography 

Dutch topographic map of the municipality of Uitgeest, June 2015

Local government 
The municipal council of Uitgeest consists of 15 seats, which are divided as follows:

Tourist information 
No less than five windmills can be seen in the polder landscape surrounding the village. Uitgeest was the birthplace (in 1550) of Cornelis Corneliszoon, inventor of the wind-powered sawmill. An industrial heritage park, centered on sawmill De Hoop, is under construction.

The village has a Reformed church dating back to the early 14th Century and lakeside marina. The outdoor kart-racing track of 670m had to make room for development of houses, so one tourist attraction has been lost. Fort along Den Ham (between Uitgeest and Krommenie) was one of the 42 forts of the Stelling van Amsterdam, a 19th-century ring of fortifications around Amsterdam which has been designated as a UNESCO World Heritage Site. The fort is now a museum open to the public on Sundays.

Transportation

Railway station: Uitgeest

Uitgeest is served by 4 trains per hour (Monday - Saturday), journey time to Amsterdam is around 20 minutes. It is recommended not to travel on the Stoptrein via Beverwijk and Haarlem as this journey is slower, and the journey via Zaandam passes through beautiful countryside.

Highway

Uitgeest is very close to the highways N8/A8 and A9. This will take you to Amsterdam in around 15 minutes. Recently (December 2010) the A9 highway has been improved by adding two lanes ('spitsstroken'), improving the traffic to and from the Amsterdam region.

Notable residents

 Cornelis Corneliszoon van Uitgeest (ca.1550-ca.1600) a Dutch windmill owner who invented the wind-powered sawmill
 Willem Blaeu (1571–1638) a Dutch cartographer, atlas maker and publisher
 Hessel Gerritsz (ca.1581–1632) a Dutch engraver, cartographer and publisher 
 Jaap Knol (1896–1975) a Dutch javelin thrower, competed at the 1928 Summer Olympics
 Peter Smit (born 1952) children's writer
 Niels Kokmeijer (born 1977) a former Dutch footballer with almost 100 club caps, now manager of the Netherlands national beach soccer team
 Thijs Sluijter (born 1980) a retired Dutch footballer with over 300 club caps

Gallery

References

External links 

Official website

 
Municipalities of North Holland
Populated places in North Holland